The American Service-Members' Protection Act (ASPA, Title 2 of ), known informally as the Hague Invasion Act, is a United States federal law described as "a bill to protect United States military personnel and other elected and appointed officials of the United States government against criminal prosecution related to war crimes, Genocide and crimes against Humanity by  an international criminal court to which the United States is not party." The text of the Act has been codified as subchapter II of chapter 81 of title 22, United States Code.

Description 

In the U.S. Senate, 30 Democrats and 45 Republicans voted to pass the bill.

The United States is not a member of the International Criminal Court (ICC). The Act authorizes the President of the United States to use "all means necessary and appropriate to bring about the release of any U.S. or allied personnel being detained or imprisoned by, on behalf of, or at the request of the International Criminal Court". This authorization led to the act being colloquially nicknamed "The Hague Invasion Act", as the act allows the President to order U.S. military action, such as an invasion of The Hague, where the ICC is located, to protect American officials and military personnel from prosecution or rescue them from custody.

The bill was introduced by U.S. Senator Jesse Helms (R-NC) and U.S. Representative Tom DeLay (R-TX), as an amendment to the 2002 Supplemental Appropriations Act for Further Recovery From and Response to Terrorist Attacks on the United States (H.R. 4775). The amendment passed 75–19 (S.Amdt 3597). The bill was signed into law by President George W. Bush on August 2, 2002.

SEC. 2008. of the Act authorizes the President of the U.S. "to use all means necessary and appropriate to bring about the release of any person described in subsection (b) who is being detained or imprisoned by, on behalf of, or at the request of the International Criminal Court". The subsection (b) specifies this authority shall extend to "Covered United States persons" (members of the Armed Forces of the United States, elected or appointed officials of the United States Government, and other persons employed by or working on behalf of the United States Government) and "Covered allied persons" (military personnel, elected or appointed officials, and other persons employed by or working on behalf of the government of a NATO member country, a major non-NATO ally including Australia, Egypt, Israel, Japan, Argentina, the Republic of Korea, and New Zealand).

Effects
The act prohibits federal, state and local governments and agencies (including courts and law enforcement agencies) from assisting the International Criminal Court (ICC). For example, it prohibits the extradition of any person from the U.S. to the ICC; it prohibits the transfer of classified national security information and law enforcement information to the ICC; and it prohibits agents of the court from conducting investigations in the U.S.  

The act also prohibits U.S. military aid to countries that are party to the ICC. However, exceptions are allowed for aid to NATO members, major non-NATO allies, Taiwan, and countries that have entered into "Article 98 agreements", agreeing not to hand over U.S. nationals to the ICC. Additionally, the act does not prohibit the U.S. from assisting in the search and capture of foreign nationals wanted for prosecution by the ICC, specifically naming Saddam Hussein, Slobodan Milošević, and Osama bin Laden as examples.

See also
United States and the International Criminal Court
Universal jurisdiction
Status of forces agreement

References

External links
Text of the American Service-Members' Protection Act: . Accessed 6 March 2008.
Bill Summary & Status for the 107th Congress : HR4775 information at the Library of Congress. Accessed 8 January 2007.
Transcript of Helms's introduction of the amendment at the Library of Congress. Accessed 26 January 2004.
Jesse Helms, "Helms Introduces Amendment to Protect Servicemen From International Criminal Court" (Press Release). 26 September 2001. Accessed 8 January 2007.

Acts of the 107th United States Congress
2002 in military history
United States federal defense and national security legislation
International Criminal Court
Netherlands–United States relations
Riders to United States federal appropriations legislation